1984 in the Philippines details events of note that happened in the Philippines in the year 1984.

Incumbents

 President: Ferdinand Marcos (KBL)
 Prime Minister: Cesar Virata (KBL)
House Speaker: Nicanor Yñiguez
 Chief Justice: Enrique Fernando

Events

January
 January 27 – National and local plebiscites are held for the approval of the proposed constitutional amendments and local bills made by the Interim Batasang Pambansa.
 January 31 – Huge rally against the Presidency and dishonest governance of Ferdinand Marcos held by Pro-Aquino individuals stepped by around 25,000 people which was resulted to a crack down by the Constabulary and Police forces.

February

May
 May 14 – Parliamentary elections are held. The opposition runs for the Regular Batasang Pambansa under the United Nationalist Democratic Organization (UNIDO) and the Partido Demokratikong Pilipino–Lakas ng Bayan (PDP–Laban) against the ruling Kilusang Bagong Lipunan (KBL) of Ferdinand Marcos. The KBL wins a majority with 114 seats, but markedly down from 163 seats last election.

September
 September 1 – Typhoon Nitang strikes the Philippines. It kills 1,492 people and 1,856 more are injured. Roughly 1.6 million people are affected in the country. A total of 108,219 homes are destroyed and 142,653 more are damaged. However, President Ferdinand Marcos declared a state of calamity only after Nitang's onslaught.

December
 December 1 – Manila LRT Line 1 is opened as the Southeast Asia's first rail line.

Holidays

As per Act No. 2711 section 29, issued on March 10, 1917, any legal holiday of fixed date falls on Sunday, the next succeeding day shall be observed as legal holiday. Sundays are also considered legal religious holidays. Bonifacio Day was added through Philippine Legislature Act No. 2946. It was signed by then-Governor General Francis Burton Harrison in 1921. On October 28, 1931, the Act No. 3827 was approved declaring the last Sunday of August as National Heroes Day. As per Republic Act No. 3022, April 9 was proclaimed as Bataan Day. Independence Day was changed from July 4 (Philippine Republic Day) to June 12 (Philippine Independence Day) on August 4, 1964.

 January 1 – New Year's Day
 February 22 – Legal Holiday
 April 9 – Bataan Day 
 April 19 – Maundy Thursday
 April 20 – Good Friday
 May 1 – Labor Day
 June 12 – Independence Day 
 July 4 – Philippine Republic Day
 August 13  – Legal Holiday
 August 26 – National Heroes Day
 September 21 – Thanksgiving Day
 November 30 – Bonifacio Day
 December 25 – Christmas Day
 December 30 – Rizal Day

Entertainment and culture

 July 9 – Maria Desiree Verdadero is proclaimed 3rd runner-up in the Miss Universe 1984 pageant night was held in the James L Knight Center, Miami Beach, Florida, United States.

Sports
 July 28–August 2 – The Philippines participates in the 1984 Summer Olympics in Los Angeles, United States.

Births
 January 6 – Jared Dillinger, basketball player
 January 12 – Oyo Boy Sotto, actor, model
 January 18 – Julius Camba, reporter (d. 2013)
 January 19:
 Kelvin dela Peña, basketball player
 Xiao Chua, historian, academic and television host
 January 20 – Toni Gonzaga, singer, television host and actress
 January 21:
 Richard Gutierrez, Filipino actor and commercial model
Raymond Gutierrez, actor and television host
 January 24 – DJ Jasmin Jasmin Basar, dj, actress, model (d. 2019)
 February 11 – Jeff Chan, basketball player
 February 14 – John Prats, actor, comedian, and dancer 
 March 6:
 Joseph Christian Rubin, Knights of the Altar (St. Joseph Parish)(KOA) President (1998-2003)
 Sol Mercado, basketball player
 March 11 – Bernard Cardona, television host and actor
 March 14 – Paolo Contis, actor
 March 16 – Michael Roy Jornales, actor, model, martial artist, fight, director, and singer
 March 21 – Via Antonio, actress
 March 23 – Ryan Araña, basketball player
 March 28 – Joseph Bitangcol, actor,.TV Host
 April 3 – Antoinette Jadaone, film director
 April 22 – Raymond "Emong" Quodala Vallarta, Philanthropist
 May 7 – Vandolph Quizon, actor, model
 May 18 – Aleck Bovick, actress, model, and singer
 May 19 – Ken Bono, basketball player
 May 23 – Sam Milby, Filipino-American actor, commercial model, and recording artist
 May 25 – Junjun Cabatu, basketball player
 June 4 – Gretchen Fullido, anchor and model
 June 28 – Angela Lagunzad, journalist, TV host
 June 29 – Paula Peralejo, actress and model
 July 9 – LA Tenorio, basketball player
 July 16 – Ginger Conejero, journalist and television personality
 July 19 – Alessandra De Rossi, actress
 July 24:
 Bubbles Paraiso, actress, model
 Pia Gutierrez, news reporter
 Boy 2 Quizon, comedian and actor
 July 27 – Jaymee Joaquin
 August 10:
 Mariel Rodriguez,  commercial model, television host and actress
 Anna Theresa Licaros, beauty queen
 August 12 – Marian Rivera, commercial model and actress
 August 18 – Sam Y.G., radio and television personality
 August 23 – Eric Tai, actor, host, and rugby player
 August 27 – Macky Escalona, basketball player
 August 29 – Rejoice Rivera, actress and singer (died of 2010)
 September 14 – Tyron Perez, actor, model (died of 2011)
 September 17 - Mark Shandii Bacolod, Filipino director, producer and talent manager (died of 2022)
 September 22 – Marcelito Pomoy, singer
 September 27 – Macky Escalona, former basketball player
 October 7 – Anna Larrucea, actress
 November 13 – Dimples Romana actress
 November 16 – Janelle Jamer actress model singer
 November 19 – Janus del Prado, actor
 November 20 – Daisy Lopez, actress and vlogger
 November 23 – Gianna Lynn, actress, model
 November 28 – Joross Gamboa, actor
 November 29 – Sitti Navarro, Filipina bossa nova singer
 December 8 – Hero Angeles, actor
 December 10 – Krista Ranillo, Filipina actress
 December 20 – Liezel Garcia, Filipina singer-songwriter and actress
 December 30 – Rico Barrera
 December 31 – Marvin Cruz, basketball player

Deaths
 February 10 – Claudia Zobel, Filipino actress 
 February 17 - Ading Fernando, a comedian, TV director (b. 1925)
 February 18 – Alejo Santos, Filipino soldier and World War II hero (b. 1911)
 March 26 – Sergio Osmeña Jr., Filipino politician, former mayor of Cebu City
 May 24 – Gen. Tomas B. Karingal, Former chief of Quezon City Police Department. (b. 1915)
 November 14 – Cesar Climaco, Filipino politician (b. 1916)

Deaths Unknown
 Cipriano P. Sandoval, editor

References